Conor O'Grady may refer to:

 Conor O'Grady (footballer)

See also
 Connor O'Grady